David Herbert Somerset Cranage (10 October 1866 – 22 October 1957) was an Anglican Dean.

Born on 10 October 1866, the son of Dr Joseph Edward Cranage of Old Hall, Wellington, Shropshire, he was educated at King's College, Cambridge. Ordained in 1897, he held curacies at Little Wenlock (1897–98) and Much Wenlock (1898–1902) in Shropshire. He was an academic at the University of Cambridge, where he lectured on mediaeval churches and was Secretary of the Local Lectures Syndicate, until his appointment as Dean of Norwich, a post he held for 19 years. 

His published works include An Architectural Account of the Churches of Shropshire, The Home of the Monk, Loyalty and Order, Cathedrals and How They Were Built, and his autobiography Not Only a Dean, which was published in 1952.

He died on 22 October 1957, aged 91.

Notes

External links
 
 
 

1866 births
Alumni of King's College, Cambridge
Deans of Norwich
1957 deaths
Academics of the Institute of Continuing Education